Raymond Laurent (24 July 1931 – 12 May 2010) was a New Zealand rower.

Laurent was born in 1931 in Waitara, New Zealand. He was a member of Clifton Rowing Club. He represented New Zealand at the 1956 Summer Olympics. He is listed as New Zealand Olympian athlete number 104 by the New Zealand Olympic Committee.

Laurent died on 12 May 2010 in Waitara, New Zealand. He had five children with his wife Nola.

References

1931 births
2010 deaths
New Zealand male rowers
Rowers at the 1956 Summer Olympics
Olympic rowers of New Zealand
People from Taranaki